Aleksandar Jevtić (born 30 March 1985) is a Serbian retired football striker .

Career statistics

References

External links
Profile at Serbian Federation site. 
Profile at Srbijafudbal.
Aleksandar Jevtić Stats at Utakmica.rs

 

1985 births
Living people
Sportspeople from Šabac
Serbian footballers
Association football forwards
Serbia international footballers
Serbian expatriate footballers
Serbian expatriate sportspeople in Turkey
Serbian expatriate sportspeople in China
Serbian expatriate sportspeople in Belarus
Serbian expatriate sportspeople in Thailand
Expatriate footballers in Turkey
Expatriate footballers in China
Expatriate footballers in Belarus
Expatriate footballers in Thailand
Serbian SuperLiga players
Süper Lig players
Chinese Super League players
FK Balkan Mirijevo players
FK Smederevo players
FK Mačva Šabac players
FK Borac Čačak players
Hacettepe S.K. footballers
OFK Beograd players
Red Star Belgrade footballers
Jiangsu F.C. players
Liaoning F.C. players
FC BATE Borisov players
FK Jagodina players
FK Čukarički players
Aleksandar Jevtic
FK Voždovac players